Bradley J. Zavisha (born January 4, 1972) is a Canadian former professional ice hockey left winger. He was selected in the third round of the 1990 NHL Entry Draft, 43rd overall, by the Quebec Nordiques. After four seasons in the major junior Western Hockey League, Zavisha turned professional. He played two games in the National Hockey League with the Edmonton Oilers during the 1993–94 season, but the majority of his career took place in the minor leagues or in Europe. He was hampered by a serious knee injury, which caused him to miss the entire 1992–93 NHL season.

Career statistics

Regular season and playoffs

Awards 
1992 – WHL East First All-Star team

Transactions 
March 10, 1992 – Quebec trades Zavisha and Ron Tugnutt to Edmonton in exchange for Martin Ručínský
March 13, 1995 – Edmonton trades Zavisha and a sixth round selection in the 1995 NHL Entry Draft to the Philadelphia Flyers in exchange for Ryan McGill

External links 

1972 births
Living people
Birmingham Bulls (ECHL) players
Canadian expatriate ice hockey players in England
Canadian ice hockey left wingers
Cape Breton Oilers players
Edmonton Oilers players
Hershey Bears players
Ice hockey people from Alberta
Kalamazoo Wings (1974–2000) players
Kaufbeurer Adler players
Lethbridge Hurricanes players
Manchester Storm (1995–2002) players
Portland Winterhawks players
Quebec Nordiques draft picks
Seattle Thunderbirds players
St. Albert Saints players